National Route 815 (N815) is a national secondary route that forms part of the Philippine highway network, connecting the city of Cebu and the municipality of Balamban. There are four components of the route, namely: Juan Luna Avenue, Pope John Paul II Avenue, Salinas Drive, Veterans Drive and the Cebu–Balamban Transcentral Highway.

History

Route description 

N815 begins as Juan Luna Avenue from a junction with Sergio Osmeña Avenue (N840) in the North Reclamation Area within Mabolo.

The route continues as Pope John Paul II Avenue after crossing M.J. Cuenco Avenue/Cebu North Road (N8). It continues as Salinas Drive after passing underneath the Archbishop Reyes–M. Cuenco flyover through the Lahug-Kasambagan border.

N815 passes a junction with Wilson Street, which is used to access the partially-restricted Lower Torralba Street inside of Camp Lapu-Lapu, the regional military headquarters.

The route continues as Veterans Drive after a three-way intersection with Salinas Drive and Gorordo Avenue. It traverses the Central Cebu Protected Landscape and continues as the Cebu-Balamban Transcentral Highway once it leaves the boundary limits of Cebu City, entering Balamban.  It terminates within the Balamban municipality proper at a junction with Toledo–Tabuelan–San Remigio Road (N820).

Hazards 
This road has many turns and is prone to accidents.  It is also notorious for landslides that often happen during or after heavy downpours. One of the landslides left 11 vehicles damaged in 2017.  The road has numerous stretches of ascending and descending portions. A bus fell off a  ravine after a sharp turn; the accident killed 21 foreign medical students.

References 

Roads in Cebu